The 27th Busan International Film Festival was held from October 5 at the Busan Cinema Center in Busan, South Korea till October 14. This year, the festival restarted events and program sections which were not conducted due to COVID-19 for last 2 years. The festival opened with Iranian film Scent of the Wind by director Seyed Hadi Mohaghegh, Jeon Yeo-been with Ryu Jun-yeol were master of ceremonies for the opening ceremony. 

In 27th edition 243 films from 71 countries were invited, in these films there were 89 world premieres, and 13 international premieres. 111 community service films were also part of 2022 festival.

This year BIFF opened special program, ‘The New Wave of Japanese Cinema’ dedicated to 10 notable next-generation Japanese directors. 10 Japanese-directed films selected by director Ryusuke Hamaguchi, Shozo Ichiyama, the executive director of the Tokyo International Film Festival, Teruoka Sozo, a programmer at the Osaka Asian Film Festival, and Toshiyuki Hasegawa, a programmer at the Skip City International D Cinema Film Festival, will be screened during the course of the festival. Another addition to special program was 'A New Perspective on Documentary in the 21st Century', which introduced 10 innovative documentaries. These films were fresh and unique works that are outside the traditional documentary framework. The third feature of  'Special Program in Focus' was screening of 6 films of Tony Leung, a Hong Kong actor and singer, who is also the winner of the 'Asian Filmmaker of the Year' award this year.

The festival visited by 160,000 people closed on October 14, with Japanese film One Man by director Kei Ishikawa. Han Sun-hwa with Kwon Yul hosted the closing ceremony of the festival.

Events
 Actors' House: Contemporary actors representing Korea, having acting talents and star qualities, tell honest and in-depth stories about their acting and works.
 BIFF in the Neighborhood: BIFF in the Neighborhood is a program where the entire village of Busan is transformed into a venue for the film festival.
 Cinema Together: October 10 to 12 — Mentors and mentees program with 16 people including directors, actors, critics, and music directors acting as mentors.
 Everything About Avatar: The Way of Water:
 Unveiling of the remastered version of Nakdong River: The film Nakdong River (1952) by Jeon Chang-geun, produced during the Korean War will be digitally remastered and premiered at the festival.

Jury

New Currents Award
 Serge Toubiana, a French journalist and film critic . He was director of the Cinémathèque française and  president of Unifrance, (Chairman of jury) 
 Alain Guiraudie, French film director and screenwriter 
 Kamila Andini, an Indonesian film director
 Ryō Kase, a Japanese actor
 Lee Yoo-Jin, CEO of Film History and South Korean producer.

Kim Jiseok Award
 Jean-Michel Frodon, a French journalist, critic and historian of cinema.
 Naoko Ogigami, a Japanese film director, screenwriter, and cinematographer.  
 Kim Hee-jung, director and winner of the 21st Busan International Film Festival APM Creative Content Agency Director's Award.

BIFF Mecenat Award
 Wang Bing, Chinese director, documentary film-maker. Chairman of the jury for the BIFF Mecenat Awards
 Mohammed Osama, Syrian director
 Kim Il-ran, South Korean director

Sonje Award

 Saeed Roustayi, Iranian director, screenwriter and producer
 Hayakawa Chie, Japanese director
 Yoon Ga-eun, South Korean film director and script writer

FIPRESCI Award
 Eija Niskanen, Finnish film critic and film event coordinator. 
 Wang Hsin, a Taiwanese writer and cultural critic.
 Ahn Chi-yong, South Korean film critic, A member of both the International Federation of Film Critics (FIPRESCI) and the Korean Association of Film Critics, Ahn writes film critiques at Le Monde diplomatique and OhmyNews.

NETPAC Award
 Gerwin Tamsma, Netherlands Film Critic
 Tsengel Davaasambuu, Mongolia Film Producer
 Kim Dong-hyun, Festival Director of Seoul Independent Film Festival

Actor of the Year Award
 Lee Young-ae, a South Korean actress
 Kim Sang-kyung, a South Korean actor

Program sections
Source: 

The festival has following sections:
 Gala Presentation
 Icons
 New Currents
 Jiseok
 Korean Cinema Today Vision Section
 World Cinema
 Flash Forward
 Wide Angle
 Open Cinema
 Midnight Passion
 On Screen
 Special Program in Focus
 Discovering New Japanese Cinema
 New Perspective of Documentary in the 21st Century

Opening and closing films
Source:

Gala Presentation

Icons

New Currents
The selected titles are eligible for multiple awards, including the New Currents Award, the FIPRESCI Award, the NETPAC Award, and the KB New Currents Audience Award. 

Highlighted title indicates award winner

Jiseok

A Window on Asian Cinema
{| class="sortable wikitable" style="width:100%; margin-bottom:4px" cellpadding="5"
|-
!scope="col" | English title
!scope="col" | Original title
!scope="col" | Director(s)
!scope="col" | Production countrie(s)
|-
| Arnold Is a Model Student 
|
| Sorayos Prapapan
| Thailand, Singapore, France, Netherlands, Philippines
|-
| colspan=2| Autobiography || Makbul Mubarak || Indonesia, France, Singapore, Poland, Philippines, Germany, Qatar
|-
| B for Busy 
| 爱情神话
| Shao Yi-Hui
| China
|-
| Before, Now & Then 
| Nana
| Kamila Andini
| Indonesia
|-
| Beyond the Wall 
| شب، داخلی، دیوار
| Vahid Jalilvand
| Iran
|-
|Declaration 
| Ariyippu
| Mahesh Narayanan
| India 
|-
| colspan=2|Fortune 
| Muhiddin Muzaffar
| Tajikistan 
|-
| colspan=2|Goldfish 
| Pushan Kripalani
| India, United Kingdom, United States
|-
| Hanging Gardens ||Janain mualaqa
| Ahmed Yassin Al Daradji
| Iraq, Egypt, Palestine, Saudi Arabia, Lebanon, United Kingdom 
|-
| colspan=2| Holy Spider
| Ali Abbasi
| Denmark, Sweden, France, Germany 
|-
| colspan=2| Home for Sale
| Taalaibek Kulmendeev
| Kyrgyzstan
|-
| colspan=2| Hong Kong Family
| Eric Tsang Hing Weng
| Hong Kong, China
|-
|colspan=2| In Our Prime
| Liu Yulin
| China
|-
| colspan=2|Joyland 
| Saim Sadiq
| Pakistan 
|-
| Leila's Brothers ||برادران لیلا
| Saeed Roustayi
| Iran 
|-
| colspan=2|Little Blue 
| Lee Yifang
| Taiwan 
|-
| colspan=2|Look At Me Touch Me Kiss Me 
| Ho Yuhang, Djenar Maesa Ayu, Kim Tai-sik 
| Malaysia, Indonesia, Korea 
|-
| Love Life 
| ラブライフ
| Kōji Fukada
| Japan 
|-
| colspan=2|Mariam 
| Arvind Pratap
| India 
|-
| colspan=2|Nezouh 
| Soudade Kaadan
| United Kingdom, Syria, France 
|-
| colspan=2|Plan 75 
| Chie Hayakawa
| Japan, France, Philippines, Qatar 
|-
| Return to Dust ||隐入尘烟
| Li Ruijun
| China 
|-
| Return to Seoul ||Retour à Séoul
| Davy Chou
| France
|-
| Scheme||Skhema
| Farkhat Sharipov
| Kazakhstan
|-
| Sermon to the Fish||Balıqlara xütbə
| Hilal Baydarov
| Azerbaijan, Mexico, Switzerland, Turkey
|-
| colspan=2|Stone Turtle
| Woo Ming Jin
| Malaysia, Indonesia
|-
| colspan=2|The Sales Girl 
| Janchivdorj Sengedorj
| Mongolia
|-
| colspan=2|The Scent of the Wormwood 
| Aibek Dairbekov
| Kyrgyzstan
|-
| colspan=2|The Wind Will Say 
| Renai Wei Yongyao
| Malaysia, China
|-
| colspan=2|Tora's Husband 
| Rima Das
| India 
|-
| colspan=2|Zwigato 
| Nandita Das
| India 
|-
|}

Korean Cinema Today - Panorama

Korean Cinema Today - Vision Section
This year 12 films will be showcased as world premiere.
Highlighted title indicates award winner

Korean Cinema Today - Special Premiere
Source:

World Cinema

Flash Forward
A competition among non-Asian filmmakers’ first or second features that take an innovative and original approach to cinema. The winner is decided by the audience and awarded the Flash Forward Award.

Wide Angle
Korean Short Film Competition

Asian Short Film Competition

Documentary Competition

Documentary Showcase

Open Cinema
A collection of new and internationally acclaimed films, offering an ideal mix of the popular with the artistic are screened at the hallmark outdoor theater.

Midnight Passion
A collection of thrillers, horror and action films.

On Screen 
Nine drama series of the year were presented in this section.

Special program in focus
Discovering New Japanese Cinema
The festival will screen the works of 10 notable next-generation Japanese directors who have made their debuts after 2010 and who have been acknowledged by the press and critics.

New Perspective of Documentary in the 21st Century
In 2022 edition the festival will present a special program 'A New Perspective on Documentary in the 21st Century' introducing 10 innovative documentaries. These films will be fresh and unique works that go beyond the traditional documentary genre.

In the Mood for Tony Leung

Special Screening

Awards and winners
Awards

The following awards will be presented at the 27th edition:

The Asian Filmmaker of the Year
Korean Cinema Award
New Currents Award
Kim Jiseok Award
BIFF Mecenat Award
Sonje Award
Actor & Actress of the Year Award
Actor of the Year: 
Actress of the Year: 
 KB New Currents Audience Award
Flash Forward Audience Award
FIPRESCI Award
NETPAC Award
DGK MEGABOX Award
CGV Arthouse Award
KBS Independent Film Award
CGK Award (Cinematographers Guild of Korea)
Critic b Award
Watcha Award from 2021
 Citizen Critics' Award
Busan Cinephile Award

Winners

New Currents Award: 
 A Wild Roomer by Lee Jeong-hong, South Korea
 Shivamma by Jaishankar Aryar, India 
 KIM Jiseok Award:
 Scent of Wind by Hadi Mohaghegh, Iran
 Alterations by Yalkin Tuychiev, Uzbekistan
 BIFF Mecenat Award
 A Table for Two by Kim Bo-ram, South Korea	
 The Football Aficionado by Sharmin Mojtahedzadeh, Paliz Khoshdel, Iran
 Sonje Award:
 Southern Afternoon by Lan Tian, China	
 I’m Here by Jeong Eunuk, South Korea
 Actors of the Year:
 Kim Youngsung, Big Sleep, Actor, South Korea	
 KIM Geumsoon, Star of Ulsan, Actress, South Korea	
 KB New Currents Audience Award:
 The Winter Within by Aamir Bashir, India, France, Qatar	
 Flash Forward Audience Award:	
 Riceboy Sleeps by Anthony Shim, Canada
 FIPRESCI Award:
 Thousand and One Nights by Kubota Nao, Japan
 NETPAC Award:	
 A Wild Roomer by Lee Jeong-hong, Director South Korea
 DGK MEGABOX Award:
 Big Sleep by Kim Tae-hoon, South Korea	
 Star of Ulsan by Jung Ki-hyuk, South Korea
 CGV Award	Greenhouse:
 Lee Sol-hui, Director, South Korea	
 KBS Independent Film Award:
 A Wild Roomer by Lee Jeong-hong, South Korea
 CGK Award:
 Hail to Hell by Jung Grim, Cinematographer	South Korea	
 Critic b Award:
 A Wild Roomer by Lee Jeong-hong, South Korea
 Watcha Award:	
 Peafowl by Byun Sung-bin, South Korea	
 Greenhouse by Lee Sol-hui, South Korea
 Watcha Short Award:
 Other Life by Roh Dohyeon, South Korea	
 Aurora Media Award:
 Greenhouse by Lee Sol-hui, South Korea
 Big Sleep by Kim Tae-hoon, South Korea	
 Citizen Critics’ Award:
 Birth by Yoo Ji-young, South Korea	
 Busan Cinephile Award:	
 While We Watched'' by Vinay Shukla, United Kingdom	
 The Choon-yun Award	
 Baej Jae-ho, Producer, South Korea

References

External links 
 

Busan International Film Festival
Busan International Film Festival
2022 in South Korea
Busan International Film Festival